Nicholas Thomas Picciuto (August 27, 1921 – January 10, 1997) was an American professional baseball player who appeared in 36 games, mainly as a third baseman, in Major League Baseball as a member of the  Philadelphia Phillies.

Picciuto attended Michigan State University and began his pro baseball career in 1944 with the Utica Blue Sox, the Phillies' Eastern League farm club. The following season, the last year of MLB's World War II manpower shortage, he had two extended stays on the Philadelphia roster, from May 11, 1945, to June 10, and from September 12 to 30. He amassed 12 hits, including six doubles, in 89 at bats, batting .135 with six runs batted in.  He returned to the minor leagues in 1946 and retired from baseball after the following season.

He died in Winchester, Virginia, aged 75, on January 10, 1997.

References

External links

1921 births
1997 deaths
Baseball players from Newark, New Jersey
Hartford Chiefs players
Major League Baseball third basemen
Minneapolis Millers (baseball) players
Philadelphia Phillies players
Tulsa Oilers (baseball) players
Utica Blue Sox players